Miguel Adrian Ferrera Rodríguez (born 25 May 1981) is a Honduran taekwondo practitioner. Ferrera qualified for the men's 80 kg class at the 2008 Summer Olympics in Beijing, after placing second from the Pan American Qualification Tournament in Cali, Colombia. He lost the preliminary round of sixteen match to China's Zhu Guo, with a final score of 1–3. Ferrera was also the nation's flag bearer at the opening ceremony.

In 2015 Ferrera become the first athlete from Honduras to be inducted into the World Hall of Fame of the International Taekwondo Federation (ITF). ITF also granted him a wild card entry spot at the 2016 Olympics.

Ferrera competed for Honduras at the 2016 Summer Olympics in Rio de Janeiro in the men's 80 kg class. He was defeated by Mehdi Khodabakhshi of Iran in the first round. He was the flag bearer for Honduras in the closing ceremony.

References

External links

NBC Olympics Profile

Honduran male taekwondo practitioners
1981 births
Living people
Olympic taekwondo practitioners of Honduras
Taekwondo practitioners at the 2008 Summer Olympics
Taekwondo practitioners at the 2016 Summer Olympics
Taekwondo practitioners at the 2015 Pan American Games
Taekwondo practitioners at the 2019 Pan American Games
Taekwondo practitioners at the 2011 Pan American Games
Taekwondo practitioners at the 2007 Pan American Games
Pan American Games competitors for Honduras
21st-century Honduran people